New Point is a town in Salt Creek Township, Decatur County, Indiana, United States. The population was 331 at the 2010 census.

History
New Point was laid out in 1859.

Geography
The town is located approximately one-half mile south of Interstate 74 at Exit 143. (State Highway 46 runs parallel to the town on its north side.) Utilities include city water and city sewage. At the present there is no natural gas piped to the town. The closest connection is 5.5 miles to the east on State Highway 46.

New Point is located at  (39.309546, -85.329376).

The town is divided geographically by an active railway running east to Cincinnati, Ohio and west to Indianapolis, Indiana. Tub Creek, a tiny stream, originates just north of New Point and runs through it from north to south.

Demographics

The community boasts a small post office, community center, park, and a volunteer fire department. There is a small restaurant (Midtown Diner), a convenience store, and a truck stop. There is usually one police officer employed by the town. New Point also has quite a few local businesses: a trucking company: Billman Trucking Inc., several small factories such as Wood-Mizer Products, Incorporated, Raver Ready-Mix Concrete, a concrete statue business (Snyder's Concrete Statues) and other small businesses. It is surrounded by family-owned and operated farms and agricultural enterprises. Also, a local golf course (North Branch) and a productive stone quarry (New Point Stone, Co) lie approximately 1–2 miles north/northwest of the town.

There are two churches: The New Point Christian Church and The New Point Baptist Church.

The town is governed by a board of elected officials.

2010 census
As of the census of 2010, there were 331 people, 124 households, and 84 families residing in the town. The racial makeup of the town was 99.4% White, 0.3% Asian, and 0.3% from two or more races. Hispanic or Latino of any race were 0.6% of the population.

There were 124 households, of which 39.5% had children under the age of 18 living with them, 48.4% were married couples living together, 12.9% had a female householder with no husband present, 6.5% had a male householder with no wife present, and 32.3% were non-families. 23.4% of all households were made up of individuals, and 11.3% had someone living alone who was 65 years of age or older. The average household size was 2.67 and the average family size was 3.18.

The median age in the town was 36.6 years. 28.1% of residents were under the age of 18; 5.8% were between the ages of 18 and 24; 26% were from 25 to 44; 25.1% were from 45 to 64; and 15.1% were 65 years of age or older. The gender makeup of the town was 51.4% male and 48.6% female.

2000 census
As of the census of 2000, there were 290 people, 106 households, and 82 families residing in the town. The racial makeup of the town was 98.62% White, 0.34% African American, 0.34% Asian, 0.34% from other races, and 0.34% from two or more races. Hispanic or Latino of any race were 0.34% of the population.

There were 106 households, out of which 38.7% had children under the age of 18 living with them, 63.2% were married couples living together, 10.4% had a female householder with no husband present, and 21.7% were non-families. 17.0% of all households were made up of individuals, and 7.5% had someone living alone who was 65 years of age or older. The average household size was 2.74 and the average family size was 3.04.

In the town, the population was spread out, with 27.2% under the age of 18, 6.2% from 18 to 24, 33.1% from 25 to 44, 19.3% from 45 to 64, and 14.1% who were 65 years of age or older. The median age was 36 years. For every 100 females, there were 116.4 males. For every 100 females age 18 and over, there were 102.9 males.

The median income for a household in the town was $39,583, and the median income for a family was $40,694. Males had a median income of $31,607 versus $28,750 for females. The per capita income for the town was $21,116. About 6.6% of families and 7.3% of the population were below the poverty line, including 12.0% of those under the age of eighteen and 5.3% of those 65 or over.

Miscellany
The community has an annual festival called Crackaway Daze which is held on the third full weekend of September. There is also an annual Volunteer Fireman's Picnic held at the firestation to raise money for funding for the fire department, including food, games, a dunk tank, and raffle.

There once was a school where the park is currently located. This school was no longer used after the consolidation of community schools into a larger county school corporation (North and South Decatur Schools). The park is now used for the Crackaway Daze festival, local events, and little league.

New Point, like the rest of Decatur County, has seen a lot of economic development in recent years. Many small businesses and housing developments have appeared, changing the cultural landscape of the small village. A recently added mobile home park has increased the population, but has also led to an influx of new residents. The town government seems to be fairly active, but has also led to controversy amongst the citizens of New Point.

Just across Highway 46, there is a convenience store called Day and Night. This store was once locally owned, but has since come under new ownership, which has since become a BP franchise.

A motel is also open next door from BP called Motel 46.

North of this there is a truck stop. This truck stop is owned by the G & G Oil corporation of Muncie, Indiana, who have made it part of the "Petro" franchise. This truck stop has a reputation for being a mom-and-pop truck stop. The truck stop was under the management of Robert and LaVonne "Bonnie" Morton, of New Point, for the longest time, thus giving it the name Bob's Truck Stop. Bob was in charge of the trucking aspect; service, managing, as well as towing. Bonnie managed the restaurant and its many employees over the years. It is currently managed by Gary Copeland, who is also active in local radio and business. The truck stop features a travel store, restaurant, shower and laundry facilities, and a tiny arcade. There is also a service center for commercial trucks.

References

External links

 Town of New Point, Indiana website

Towns in Decatur County, Indiana
Towns in Indiana
1859 establishments in Indiana
Populated places established in 1859